Dromedary, also known as the Dromedary Quartet, is an American world music band originally based out of Athens, Georgia but now with members on both coasts. The group formed as a duo consisting of Andrew Reissiger and Rob McMaken playing a variety of instruments from cultures across the globe. The group's most recent album Sticks and Stones features New Orleans-to-Athens transplant Louis Romanos (percussion) and Chris Enghauser (bass).

Instruments utilized include the Bolivian charango, the Turkish cumbus, the Appalachian dulcimer, mandolin, and guitar.

The duo have also been frequent collaborators with North Carolina-based singer-songwriter Jonathan Byrd.  Together they recorded The Sea and The Sky, an album of songs Byrd wrote inspired by a band.

Discography 
 Artifact (2001)
 Live from the Make Believe (2003)
 Dromedary Quartet (2006)
 Sticks and Stones (2008)

with Jonathan Byrd 
 The Sea and The Sky (2004, Waterbug)
 This Is The New That (2007, Waterbug)

Further reading 
 Budd Kopman, "Quartet", All About Jazz, August 15, 2006
 "Dromedary Expands to a Quartet and Presents New Album", World Music Central, August 12, 2006
 Mike Joyce, "Jonathan Byrd & Dromedary - The Sea & the Sky, (Waterbug), Andrew McKnight - Beyond Borders (Falling Mountain)" (reviews), The Washington Post, February 25, 2005, p.WE08
Liz Carlisle, "The Best New Folk of Summer 2004: Part II: The intellectuals" (CD review), The Harvard Independent, October 7, 2004
Matt Watroba, "Jonathan Byrd & Dromedary: forces of nature", Sing Out!, 48:3, Fall 2004  (link—requires subscription to highbeam.com)
Francois Couture, [ "Review: Live from the Make Believe], Allmusic, 2003
Francois Couture, [ "Review: Artifact], Allmusic
Matt Hutchinson, "We are not the world: Athens duo Dromedary breathes American life into international flavors", CreativeLoafing.com, October 30, 2003
Daniel Arizona, "Splendid reviews: Dromedary - Artifact", Splendid, January 21, 2002
Carool Kersten, "Review: Dromedary - Artifact", Rambles, January 25, 2003

External links 
 Dromedary, official web site
 Dromedary at MySpace
 [ Dromedary] at Allmusic

American folk musical groups
Musical groups from Georgia (U.S. state)
American world music groups
2001 establishments in Georgia (U.S. state)
Musicians from Athens, Georgia
Musical groups established in 2001